Albert-Georges-Yves Malbois (17 November 1915 – 12 February 2017) was a French prelate of the Roman Catholic Church.

Biography
Malbois was born in Versailles, France, and was ordained to the priesthood on 29 June 1938 in the Diocese of Versailles. He became a vicar in Saint-Cloud in 1939. He was appointed Titular Bishop of Altava and Auxiliary Bishop on  9 March 1961, and received his episcopal consecration on 22 April 1961. On 9 October 1966 he was appointed bishop of Corbeil-Essonnes-Évry, a position he held until his resignation in September 1977. He turned 100 in November 2015. Malbois died on 12 February 2017 at the age of 101.

References

External links
Catholic-Hierarchy
Diocese site of Evry-Corbeil Essonnes (French)
Diocese site of Versailles (French)

1915 births
2017 deaths
French centenarians
20th-century Roman Catholic bishops in France
Participants in the Second Vatican Council
Men centenarians